Kiabi's angular-toed gecko (Cyrtopodion kiabii ) is a species of gecko, a lizard in the family Gekkonidae. The species is endemic to southern Iran.

Etymology
The specific name, kiabii, is in honor of Iranian ecologist Bahram Hassanzadeh Kiabi of Shahid Beheshti University.

Geographic range
C. kiabii is found in Bushehr Province, Iran.

References

Further reading
Ahmadzadeh F, Flecks M, Torki F, Böhme W (2011). "A new species of angular-toed gecko, genus Cyrtopodion (Squamata: Gekkonidae), from southern Iran". Zootaxa 2924: 22–32. (Cyrtopodion kiabii, new species).

Cyrtopodion
Reptiles described in 2011